Queen Yongmok of the Yi clan was a Korean queen consort as the third wife of Jeongjong of Goryeo while her sister became Deokjong of Goryeo's fourth wife. As a queen, she lived in Changseong Palace (창성궁, 昌盛宮) and bore Jeongjong a daughter, Princess Doae.

References

Cites

Books

External links
 Queen Yongmok on Encykorea .
Queen Yongmok on Goryeosa .
용목왕후 on Doosan Encyclopedia .

Royal consorts of the Goryeo Dynasty
Korean queens consort
Year of birth unknown
Year of death unknown
People from Buyeo County